Canterbury is a first-class cricket team based in Canterbury, New Zealand. It is one of six teams that compete in senior New Zealand Cricket competitions and has been the second most successful domestic team in New Zealand history. They compete in the Plunket Shield first-class competition and The Ford Trophy one day competition as well as in the Men's Super Smash competition as the Canterbury Kings.

Honours
 Plunket Shield (19)
1922–23, 1930–31, 1934–35, 1945–46, 1948–49, 1951–52, 1955–56, 1959–60, 1964–65, 1975–76, 1983–84, 1993–94, 1996–97, 1997–98, 2007–08, 2010–11, 2013–14, 2014–15, 2016–17, 2020–21

 The Ford Trophy (15)
1971–72, 1975–76, 1976–77, 1977–78, 1985–86, 1991–92, 1992–93, 1993–94, 1995–96, 1996–97, 1998–99, 1999–00, 2005–06, 2016–17, 2020–21

 Men's Super Smash (1)
2005–06

Grounds
Canterbury play their home matches at Hagley Oval in Christchurch and occasionally at Mainpower Oval in Rangiora.

Current squad

 No. denotes the player's squad number, as worn on the back of their shirt.
  denotes players with international caps.

References

Further reading
 "Fifty Years of Cricket: Jubilee of the CCA" from The Press, 23 December 1927

External links
Canterbury Cricket Official Website
Canterbury Kings Official Website

New Zealand first-class cricket teams
Cricket clubs established in 1864
Cricket in Canterbury
Super Smash (cricket)